Golden Apples of the Sun is the second studio album by American singer and songwriter Judy Collins, released by Elektra Records in 1962.

In 2001, Elektra re-released the album on CD with Collins' first album, A Maid of Constant Sorrow (1961).

Critical reception
In retrospective reviews, Bruce Eder of AllMusic wrote that Collins "generates a much more attractive sound and body of work, with a freer, less rigid approach that gives the songs a chance to breathe and flow." Richard Harrington of The Washington Post called the title track "brilliant", writing that the album presents Collins "in her traditional folksinger stage, reinvigorating folk standards."

Track listing
All songs traditional, arranged by Judy Collins, unless otherwise noted.

Side one
 "Golden Apples of the Sun" (lyrics by William Butler Yeats, from the poem "The Song of Wandering Aengus"; music by Judy Collins) – 3:55
 "Bonnie Ship the Diamond" – 2:19
 "Little Brown Dog" – 3:12
 "Twelve Gates to the City" – 3:17
 "Christ Child Lullaby" – 2:55
 "Great Selchie of Shule Skerry" – 5:03

Side two
 "Tell Me Who I'll Marry" – 3:46
 "Fannerio" – 3:05
 "Crow on the Cradle" (Sydney Carter) – 3:25
 "Lark in the Morning" – 0:56
 "Sing Hallelujah" (Mike Settle) – 2:39
 "Shule Aroon" – 3:17

Personnel
Judy Collins – guitar, keyboards, vocals

Additional musicians
Walter Raim – second guitar
Bill Lee – bass

Technical
Jac Holzman – production supervisor
Mark Abramson – engineer
William S. Harvey – cover design
George Pickow – cover photo
Peter J. Welding – liner notes

References

1962 albums
Judy Collins albums
Albums produced by Jac Holzman
Elektra Records albums